Leslie Alexander Lett was an Anglican priest in  the second half of the twentieth century.

He was educated at Laurentian University and Codrington College, Barbados; and ordained in 1960. After  curacies in Antigua and St Kitts he was Priest in charge  of St George Montserrat. After this he held incumbencies in Barbados before becoming  Dean of  St. George's Cathedral, Kingstown St Vincent, a post he held from 1974 to 1977.

References

Laurentian University alumni
Alumni of Codrington College
Deans of St George's Cathedral, Kingstown